Abigail Goldman is an American journalist. She won a 2004 Pulitzer Prize for National Reporting and 2004 George Polk Award. She teaches at University of California, Los Angeles.

She graduated from University of Wisconsin-Madison and Columbia University Graduate School of Journalism. She worked for the Los Angeles Times.

References 

American journalists
Pulitzer Prize winners
George Polk Award recipients
Living people
Year of birth missing (living people)
University of Wisconsin–Madison alumni
Columbia University Graduate School of Journalism alumni